Thomas James Brennan was a Scottish professional footballer who played in the Football League for Gillingham, Blackburn Rovers, Stockport County and Crystal Palace as an inside forward. He also played in the Scottish League for East Stirlingshire.

Career statistics

References 

Scottish footballers
English Football League players
1911 births
Date of death missing
Footballers from North Lanarkshire
Association football inside forwards
Gillingham F.C. players
Crystal Palace F.C. players
Leith Athletic F.C. players
Tunbridge Wells F.C. players
Blackburn Rovers F.C. players
Stockport County F.C. players
Year of death unknown
Scottish Football League players
East Stirlingshire F.C. players